Camilo Ernesto Estévez Muiña (born February 14, 1970) is a Puerto Rican handball coach of the Puerto Rican national team.

He coached them at the 2015 World Women's Handball Championship.

References

Living people
Place of birth missing (living people)
Handball coaches of international teams
1970 births